Bodanones is a village  on Saurashtra peninsula in Gujarat, western India.

History 

Bodanones was a village controlled by (Kamliya Kathi) chieftain.

It had a population of 136 in 1901, yielding a state revenue of 1,200 Rupees (mostly from land; 1903-4) and paying 112 Rupees tribute, to the Gaekwar Baroda State and to Junagadh State.

During the British Raj, the petty state in Gohelwar prant was under the colonial Eastern Kathiawar Agency.

External links and sources 
 DSAL.UChicago - Kathiawar

Specific

Princely states of Gujarat